The 2012–13 Northern Illinois Huskies men's basketball team represented Northern Illinois University during the 2012–13 NCAA Division I men's basketball season. The Huskies, led by second year head coach Mark Montgomery, played their home games at the Convocation Center and were members of the West Division of the Mid-American Conference. They finished the season 5–25, 3–13 in MAC play to finish in last place in the West Division. They lost in the first round of the MAC tournament to Eastern Michigan.

Class of 2012 Signees

Roster

Schedule

|-
!colspan=9| Exhibition

|-
!colspan=9| Regular season

|-
!colspan=9| 2013 MAC men's basketball tournament

NCAA Record
The Huskies set an NCAA Division I record during the shot-clock era on December 1, 2012 against the Dayton Flyers scoring five points in the first half.

This record was broken against the Eastern Michigan Eagles on January 26. 2013, where the Huskies scored four points in the first half. The Huskies had a 3.2% field goal shooting in the first half which also set a record, breaking Savannah State's 4.3% shooting percentage against Kansas State in 2008.

References

Northern Illinois Huskies men's basketball seasons
Northern Illinois
Northern
Northern